From statehood in 1896 through the creation of a second district in 1913, Utah sent one representative to the United States House of Representatives who was elected at-large statewide.

List of members representing the district

References

 Congressional Biographical Directory of the United States 1774–present

At-large
Former congressional districts of the United States
At-large United States congressional districts